The 2023 Northern Illinois Huskies football team will represent Northern Illinois University as a member of the West Division of the Mid-American Conference (MAC) during the 2023 NCAA Division I FBS football season. The Huskies are led by fifth-year head coach Thomas Hammock and play home games at Huskie Stadium in DeKalb, Illinois.

Previous season

The Huskies finished the 2022 season 3–9, 2–6 in the MAC play to finish in sixth place in the West Division.

Schedule

References

Northern Illinois
Northern Illinois Huskies football seasons
Northern Illinois Huskies football